The HSL 4 is a Belgian high-speed rail line part of the 87 kilometres (54 miles) axis which connects Antwerp to the Dutch border. It is 40 kilometres long (24 miles); 36 kilometres (22 miles) of it being dedicated high speed tracks. It was scheduled for completion by 2005 and opened in 2009.

Together with the HSL 1 to the French border and HSL-Zuid to Amsterdam, the line has shortened journeys between Brussels, Paris and the Netherlands. HSL 4 is used by Thalys, Eurostar e320, and Intercity Direct. It was formerly used by fast internal InterCity trains (Class 13 locomotives with I11 vehicles) and by Fyra, both of which were replaced by the Intercity Direct services.

Route
The high-speed HSL 4 begins just north of Antwerp (near Luchtbal), and runs 36 km where it meets the Dutch border.

From Brussels to Antwerp 
Though HSL4 begins in Antwerp, it is part of a Paris-Brussels-Amsterdam corridor. High speed trains like Thalys, upon departing Brussels for Amsterdam, first use the existing, conventional track, electrified at 3 kV DC.

From Brussels South station, trains travel northwards through the Brussels-Central and Brussels-North stations. At Schaarbeek the line splits in two; the eastern branch continues to Liège and the German border, the northern branch towards Antwerp and the Dutch border. Between Brussels and Antwerp (47 kilometres), trains travel at 160 kilometres per hour on line 25N and then the upgraded existing line 25 (with the exception of a few segments where a speed limit of 100–120 km/h is imposed).

From Antwerp north 
In Antwerp, a tunnel has been constructed underneath the city to permit high-speed trains to run directly through Antwerpen-Centraal to the new high-speed line north, an extension of line 25 until Antwerpen-Luchtbal railway station, after which line 4 (HSL 4) starts. Trains enter the 1.5-kilometre long, two-tube tunnel past Berchem at 90 kilometres per hour. They exit the tunnel at 40 km/hour, it seems due to stability and infiltration concerns.

The line surfaces at Antwerpen-Dam as line 25, and after crossing the Albert Canal, crosses the existing Antwerp-Essen line at 120 km/h. At the E19/A12 motorway junction, trains leave the regular line to run on new dedicated high-speed tracks to the Dutch border (40 kilometres away) at up to 300 kilometres per hour. The route parallels the E19 motorway until the border, which has required the building of several bridges.

The line passes through Schoten, Brasschaat, Brecht, Wuustwezel, and Hoogstraten, before crossing the border into the Netherlands and connecting to the Dutch HSL-Zuid.

Stations
Antwerpen-Centraal station has been completely reorganised. With these works completed, the station has four levels and 14 tracks:
level +1 (the original station) has 6 terminating tracks, arranged as two groups of three (line 59/1 to Ghent and line 12 to the depot, workshop and cleaning station in Antwerp-Schijnpoort) separated by an opening allowing natural light to reach the lower levels
level 0 contains ticketing facilities and commercial space
level −1 (7 meters below road level) has 4 terminating tracks, also arranged as two groups (line 27 to Brussels, for services terminating in Antwerp).
level −2 (18 meters below road level) has 4 tracks, which end up in the two-track-wide tunnel under the city (used by high-speed, InterCity and local passenger trains between the North and South of Antwerp — freight trains go around the East of Antwerp on line 27A to the harbour)

The HSL 4 is the only high-speed line in Belgium that features an intermediate station at Noorderkempen (municipality Brecht, Belgium) for use in regular speed passenger service.

Tunnel Peerdsbos ('Solar Tunnel') 
The line features a 'Solar Tunnel' near Antwerp. The above-ground tunnel Peerdsbos is comparable to an avalanche gallery except instead of snow it protects the trains from falling trees and the highway traffic on the E19. It was constructed as an alternative to felling parts of the nearby forest. The 'tunnel' is unique as it is covered with 16,000 solar panels. The line's operator claim this provides 3300 MWh of electricity per year and cuts  emissions by 2400 tonnes a year.

See also
 High-speed rail in Belgium

External links
Belgian high-speed rail site

References

High-speed railway lines in Belgium
Railway lines opened in 2009
Standard gauge railways in Belgium
Rail transport in Brussels
Rail transport in Antwerp